David Huertas (born June 2, 1987) is a Puerto Rican professional basketball player for Capitanes de Arecibo of the BSN. He also represents the Puerto Rican national team.

College career
Huertas committed to play NCAA basketball for the Florida Gators after leading his high school, Arlington Country Day in Jacksonville, Florida, to a state championship in his senior year.  In his freshman season for the Gators, he saw action in 35 games off the bench, averaging 2.5 points and 1.5 rebounds for the team, en route to the 2006 NCAA Men's Division I Basketball Tournament championship.

Unhappy with his minor role on the team, Huertas transferred to the Ole Miss Rebels after the season.  Huertas sat out the 2006–07 season because of NCAA transfer rules.  Huertas played for the Rebels in the 2007–08 and 2008–09 seasons, putting up solid numbers as a starting shooting guard.  In the 2008–09 season, he was the Rebels' leading scorer, averaging 18.1 points per game while failing to reach double figures only once in thirty games played.  His 18.1 points per game was the fourth highest total in the Southeastern Conference.  Following the season, Huertas was selected to the All-Conference Second Team.

Professional career
Following his junior season, Huertas made the decision to turn professional, signing with Puerto Rican team Piratas de Quebradillas of the Baloncesto Superior Nacional.  He joined the Piratas midseason, helping the team reach the finals, where they fell to the Vaqueros de Bayamon in six games.

With the Puerto Rican season over, Huertas participated in the June 2009 Reebok Eurocamp, impressing many with his shooting accuracy.  After this performance, he was signed by French team Fos Ouest Provence Basket of the French ProB League.  He averaged 16.1 points per game over 23 games to finish as the league's fifth best scorer.

Huertas then returned to the Piratas for the 2010 season.  He averaged 16.1 points per game for the team, leading to them to the league semifinals, where they lost in seven games to eventual champions Capitanes de Arecibo.
Huertas signed for newly promoted to the National League Hapoel Haifa in August 2016.

International career
Huertas is also a member of the Puerto Rico national basketball team. He played with the team at the 2006 Central American and Caribbean Games and the 2010 Centrobasket, helping the team win the gold medal at both tournaments.  He was selected to the national team roster for the 2010 FIBA World Championship in Turkey — his first major international tournament — after long-time players Christian Dalmau and Larry Ayuso left the team.

References

External links
 David Huertas at bsnpr.com
 David Huertas at fiba.basketball
 David Huertas at latinbasket.com
 

1987 births
Living people
2010 FIBA World Championship players
2014 FIBA Basketball World Cup players
2019 FIBA Basketball World Cup players
Baloncesto Superior Nacional players
Capitanes de Arecibo players
Central American and Caribbean Games gold medalists for Puerto Rico
Central American and Caribbean Games medalists in basketball
Club Comunicaciones (Mercedes) basketball players
Competitors at the 2006 Central American and Caribbean Games
Florida Gators men's basketball players
Fos Provence Basket players
Fuerza Regia de Monterrey players
Greek Basket League players
Halcones Rojos Veracruz players
Hapoel Haifa B.C. players
Maroussi B.C. players
Obras Sanitarias basketball players
Ole Miss Rebels men's basketball players
People from Humacao, Puerto Rico
Piratas de Quebradillas players
Point guards
Puerto Rican expatriate basketball people
Puerto Rican expatriate basketball people in Israel
Puerto Rican men's basketball players
Puerto Rico men's national basketball team players
Shooting guards
Criollos de Caguas basketball players